Paul Douglas (born 7 August 1997) is a Bermudan footballer who currently plays as a midfielder for Alvechurch.

Career statistics

International

References

1997 births
Living people
Bermudian footballers
Bermudian expatriate footballers
Bermuda under-20 international footballers
Bermuda international footballers
Association football midfielders
Ilkeston Town F.C. players
Redditch United F.C. players
Alvechurch F.C. players
Stratford Town F.C. players
Bermudian expatriate sportspeople in England
Expatriate footballers in England